The Ha'Penny Bridge Dublin is a  watercolour, of the Ha'Penny Bridge, by Samuel Frederick Brocas, from 1818.

Description 
The watercolour is 36.3 x 53.5 centimetres. It is located at the National Library of Ireland.

Analysis 
It shows the cast iron footbridge then known as The Liffey Bridge, along Aston Quay, and showing Bachelors' Walk.

References 

Watercolor paintings
Horses in art
Ships in art
1818 paintings
Bridges in art